was a Japanese water polo player. He competed in the men's tournament at the 1932 Summer Olympics. He died of wounds suffered in the Second Sino-Japanese War.

References

External links
 

1909 births
1938 deaths
Japanese male water polo players
Olympic water polo players of Japan
Water polo players at the 1932 Summer Olympics
Sportspeople from Hiroshima
Military personnel of the Second Sino-Japanese War
Military personnel killed in the Second Sino-Japanese War
20th-century Japanese people